Alok Sharma (born 12 May 1991) is an Indian cricketer. He plays Twenty20 cricket for Bengal.

See also
 List of Bengal cricketers

References

External links
 

1991 births
Living people
Indian cricketers
Bengal cricketers
Cricketers from Kolkata